Gaston Poupinel (1858-1930) was a French surgeon. A student of Louis Pasteur, in 1885 he introduced in France the first device of dry heat sterilization which started being used in many hospitals.

References 

French surgeons
1858 births
1930 deaths